Leiocephalus etheridgei, commonly known as the Morovis curlytail, is an extinct species of lizard in the family Leiocephalidae (curly-tailed lizards). The species was native to Puerto Rico.

Etymology
The specific name, etheridgei, is in honor of American herpetologist Richard Emmett Etheridge.

Geographic range
L. etherigei is only known from fossil remains found in a cave in the municipality of Morovis, Puerto Rico.

References

Further reading
Pregill G (1981). Late Pleistocene Herpetofaunas From Puerto Rico. The University of Kansas Museum of Natural History Special Publication No. 71. Lawrence: The University of Kansas. 72 pp. (Leiocephalus etheridgei, new species, pp. 35–38, Figures 17–18).
Pregill GK (1992). Systematics of the West Indian Lizard Genus Leiocephalus (Squamata: Iguania: Tropiduridae). The University of Kansas Museum of Natural History Miscellaneous Publication No. 84. Lawrence: University of Kansas. 69 pp. 

Leiocephalus
Reptiles described in 1981
Reptiles of Puerto Rico
Taxa named by Gregory Pregill